Olivier Sourgens (born 17 January 1972 in Cenon, France) is a French rugby union player. He plays at prop.

Sourgens has played six times for France A and played club rugby for Bordeaux-Bègles, Stade Montois, Pau, Bourgoin and Union Bordeaux Bègles. In June 2009, it was announced that Sourgens would move to Worcester Warriors for the 2009–10 season.

With Pieter de Villiers, Sylvain Marconnet and Olivier Milloud, all unavailable, Sourgens received an international call-up for France's two Test tour of New Zealand. Sourgens made his Test debut at the age of 35 against the All Blacks in Wellington in June 2007.

External links

Worcester Warriors Profile
France Profile

1972 births
French rugby union players
Living people
Rugby union props
Worcester Warriors players
France international rugby union players
Expatriate rugby union players in England
French expatriate sportspeople in England
French expatriate rugby union players
CS Bourgoin-Jallieu players
CA Bordeaux-Bègles Gironde players
Section Paloise players
Stade Montois players
Union Bordeaux Bègles players
Sportspeople from Gironde